Priyam is a 1996 Indian Tamil-language film directed by N. Pandian and produced by Kasthuri Film International. The film featured Arun Vijay (credited as Arunkumar) alongside Manthra, while Prakash Raj plays a supporting role. The film had music composed by Vidyasagar.

Plot synopsis
Arimath and Preetha, caught between their conflicting families, elope to get married. However, their fathers, who are famous liquor barons, chase them to prevent their union.

Cast
Arunkumar as Arimath
Manthra as Preetha
Prakash Raj as Dharma
Vadivelu
Madhan Bob
Vittal Prasad
Costumes Krishna
Sriman
Rekha
Kavitha

Soundtrack
The soundtrack was composed by Vidyasagar.

Release
The film was a moderate hit at the box office. The film was later dubbed and released in Telugu under the same name by producers C. H. Ganeswara Rao and P. Indira in 2000.

N. Pandian later began work on Perazhagi starring Ajith Kumar in 1998 for Shogun Films, and a further project for Anbalaya Films simultaneously. Neither film eventually materialised, and as a result, his next release was 365 Kadhal Kadithangal in 2010.

The producer Ashok Samrat, encouraged by the success of Priyam, began another venture soon with Pandian titled Kalvettu featuring Murali and Divya Unni. The film was later stalled due to production trouble, and Samrat opted out of the film industry.

References

External links
 

1996 films
1990s Tamil-language films
Films scored by Vidyasagar
Indian romance films
Indian romantic drama films